The Shawnee Mall is a regional shopping mall and trade area located in Shawnee, Oklahoma. It contains four department store anchors, and a total of 50 tenants comprising a total of approximately 455,420 square feet of gross leasable area. Anchor stores are Dillard's, Dunham's Sports, JCPenney (now closed), Jo-Ann's Fabrics, Jones Theatre-Movie Six, Kohl's, Ross Dress For Less, and Shoe Dept. Encore.

Herring Marathon and JCPenney built the mall. It opened in March 1989, with JCPenney, Sears, Walmart, and Dillard's as the anchor stores. A new Walmart Supercenter opened outside the mall on August 25, 2004. In 2013, Jo-Ann opened in the former Old Navy. The closure of the Sears store was announced in January 2014. That space is now occupied by Dunham's Sports. The closure of the JCPenney store was announced on June 4, 2020. The space will be an Ashley HomeStore.

References

External links
Shawnee Mall home page
Shawnee Mall at Urban Retail Properties 

Buildings and structures in Pottawatomie County, Oklahoma
Shopping malls established in 1989
Shopping malls in Oklahoma
1989 establishments in Oklahoma